Rowdy is a 2014 Indian Telugu-language action drama film written and directed by Ram Gopal Varma. It stars Vishnu Manchu and his father Mohan Babu with Jayasudha and Shanvi Srivastav in important roles. Sai Karthik composed the music for this film, while Satish Mutyala handled the cinematography. The principal photography commenced on 26 December 2013 and ended on 21 February 2014 in 30 working days. It was dubbed into Hindi as Rowdy.

The film also used sync sound and a three camera setup to reduce the work of dubbing and camera angles while in post production. The film is a remake of the Hindi film Sarkar. It was released on 4 April 2014 (worldwide) and 3 April 2014 (United States) in over 50 screens.

Upon release, the film received positive reviews, with critics praising Ram Gopal Varma's narrative and performances of Mohan Babu, Vishnu Manchu and Jayasudha. The film minted  on the first weekend of its release.

Plot 
The film opens in a street in Hyderabad in a night with Krishna (Vishnu Manchu) saving Sirisha (Shanvi Srivastava) from some eve-teasers and accompanying her to the hostel she stays. In the journey, they both come to know that they hail from the Rayalaseema region of Andhra Pradesh. When Sirisha asks Krishna about the details of his father, the scene shifts to the native place of Krishna where his father, a don fondly called as Anna (Mohan Babu) and as Annagaru with respect, punishing a teacher named Sankar Rao for harassing his pregnant wife for dowry on the complaint of the woman's father Rama Rao. Anna is a sexagenarian man who always thinks about the welfare of the people of Rayalaseema, and they too revere him equal to god. Anna is a very powerful and influential don who also controls the political affairs of that region. His friend Ananda Rao (Paruchuri Gopala Krishna), a ruling party politician, is his close friend, and he and the party extends their full support to Anna to stop the Nandavaram project whose happening would destroy 34 villages completely. On the other hand, a group of influential people working under a mysterious man tries to make the project to earn crores. The group consists of KR, Vedantham Murthy aka Vedam (Tanikella Bharani), Chandi (Jeeva), and Seshagiri.

Krishna visits his home when Anna kills his opponent Guruva Reddy (Banerjee) and appoints the dead man's henchmen as his henchmen by promising a little high salary. Then the family of Anna is introduced. Anna lives with his wife Lakshmi (Jayasudha), elder son Bhushan (Kishore), and Krishna. Bhushan is married and has a son, but he never loved them and hates them to the core. Unlike Anna and his dutiful and devoted brother Krishna, Bhushan is a spoiled brat, often terrorizing people in the name of Anna, creating fear in their hearts. When a young woman's brother warns Bhushan, Bhushan comes to their home, kidnaps the woman, and conducts a sexual assault on her in his farmhouse. Bhushan, also because of his anger on his father apart from greed for money, joins hands with KR's group for the formation of the Nandavaram project. Meanwhile, Krishna and Sirisha are deeply in love, and Anna's trusted henchmen Ramudu finds out that she is Gavarraju's daughter. Gavarraju was Anna's enemy who was killed by Anna at Tirupathi during an assassination attempt. Though Sirisha is aware of it, she has no objection to join his family, and Anna too respects Krishna's decision to marry her and accepts their alliance.

Meanwhile, Sirisha informs Krishna in their regular meeting that her friend is kidnapped and kept in Anna's farmhouse by Bhushan, who trashed her brother recently. She also adds that none dared to convey the same to Anna because of Bhushan. Krishna tells the whole matter to Anna, and when he finds the woman assaulted there, he apologizes to her and tells Ramudu to drop her in her home. He also house arrests Bhushan there forever to ensure the safety of the innocent people. But on the request of Lakshmi, he lets him enter his house again. Later, Ramudu invites Anna and Lakshmi for attending his daughter's wedding, and they accept it happily. However, Sirisha's brother reveals to Krishna that Anna is going to be fatally attacked in the way. At the time of execution, firing starts on Anna's vehicles, and in this confusion, Bhushan kills his wife and son, but none knows that. Anna is severely injured and attacked by the rivals, who are killed by Krishna. Anna is sent to the nearby hospital. Inspector Gogin Rao (Ravi Babu) asks Anna's men to get out of the hospital as the patients and their relatives are frightened of seeing them carrying weapons. This results in a brawl between Krishna and Gogin Rao, and the former is arrested for attacking a police officer on duty.

However, it is later revealed that Gogin Rao is not as sincere as he appears and works for KR. Sirisha goes to the police station and tells Krishna that Anna is going to be attacked again by the rivals' men. Krishna goes there and saves Anna from the goons. Later, as both the plans are failed, Bhushan goes to the hospital carrying oranges to the hospital and leaves soon. He keeps explosives inside them so that Anna dies because of a blast as suggested by KR and Vedam. Unfortunately, Lakshmi cuts them, and the blast occurs. Anna, who was in the way to the room conducting medical tests, collapses and understands what happened then. After Lakshmi's funeral is conducted, Krishna meets Anna and tells that KR, Gogin Rao, Chandi, Vedam, Seshagiri, and Bhushan are the culprits and adds that he would kill all of them. First, he kills Gogin Rao by strangling him with a thin wire. Next, he kills Seshagiri by feeding him a poisoned (possibly cyanide-infused) cake. Then, he kills Chandi by locking him in a car filled with gas, leading to suffocation. Vedam is murdered brutally and is hanged from a tree to resemble a suicide. KR is shot offscreen and dies when lit on fire by Krishna. Later, Krishna meets Bhushan, narrates Bhushan's plans and deeds to Bhushan himself, and when Bhushan feels guilty, Krishna calls him a mad dog and shoots him.

Finally, during Lakshmi's last rites, the main one behind the group is revealed as Ananda Rao. His close associates hold more than 50% stake in the Nandavaram project, and with that money, he planned to shift to the opposition party and win the elections. Since Anna would oppose it, he wanted to murder him and joins hands with KR and his group. On Anna's request, Krishna himself murders Ananda Rao. The film ends with Anna conducting Lakshmi's death rituals and Krishna appointing Ananda Rao's gunmen as his henchmen promising a little higher salary like Anna did in the case of Guruva Reddy.

Cast 
Vishnu Manchu as Krishna
Mohan Babu as Anna
Jayasudha as Lakshmi
Shanvi Srivastav as Sirisha
Kishore as Bhushan
Paruchuri Gopala Krishna as Anand Rao
Tanikella Bharani as Vedantham Murthy aka Vedam
Ravi Babu as Gogin Rao
Jeeva as Chandi
Banerjee as Guruva Reddy
Kalicharan Sanjay (actor)

Production 
In mid November 2013, it was reported that Ram Gopal Varma would direct Vishnu Manchu, which was confirmed by the actor in an interaction with the press. In mid-December 2013, the project materialized, and it was also reported that Ram Gopal Varma wanted to recruit Regina Cassandra as the heroine. In the end of December 2013, Mohan Babu was said to be a part of the film, and the shooting started on 26 December 2013 after a simple launch event. The filming continued at an incredible pace, and in early January 2014, a song on Mohan Babu and 2,000 extras was shot at Ramoji Film City in Hyderabad in which the people hailed him as their supremo and godfather.

After their previous film Pandavulu Pandavulu Tummeda released and became a success at the box office, it was declared in early February that the film was titled Rowdy which was confirmed by Mohan Babu at his office contrary to the reports that the film was titled Ottu, Annagaru and Seema Lekka. At the same time, Shanvi Srivastav, who was well known for her performances in the films Lovely and Adda, was selected for a short yet essential role in the film and was paired with Vishnu. In the third week of February 2014, it was reported that the film's shoot is nearing completion at an incredible speed with a romantic song on Vishnu and Shanvi being shot in just two days.

The filming finally ended on 21 February 2014 in just 30 working days. The producers said that they had a very tough time at the time of the shooting of action sequences, because of RGV's insistence on reality. The producers spoke "Rowdy is a film, we were really passionate about". It was also reported that an 11-minute action episode on Mohan Babu and Vishnu by firmly focusing the camera on them. "The interval sequence is by far one of the best fights I have ever done. Entire Credit to RGV. He has captured great action timing and finely tuned aggression by the two lead actors in the film" said Vishnu.

The producers also hailed Ram Gopal Varma regarding the handling of sentimental scenes in the film. They said "Though the director has included lots of action and drama in the film, we admired the sentimental scenes between Mohan Babu and Jayasudha. We never expected Ram Gopal Varma to add this element with such vigour. He surprised not only me but also the lead stars, with his neat direction of the sentimental sequences. The chemistry between Mohan Babu and Jayasudha that once fluttered the hearts of moviegoers has been captured well all over again with much more intensity" in a statement issued to the IANS.

Marketing 
The film's first look was released on 21 February 2014 on the occasion of completion of shoot. The first look received unanimously positive response. The film's trailer released on 7 March 2014 by Vishnu himself from USA. The trailer received great positive response from all the corners though some opined that the film had shades of Ram Gopal Varma's Hindi film Sarkar. On 11 March 2014 Ram Gopal Varma unveiled the promo of the romantic song Nee Meeda Ottu. The teaser of 107 seconds, which portrayed on screen chemistry between the lead stars Vishnu Manchu and Shanvi Srivastav, garnered tremendous response in means of shares and views on social networking sites within few hours of its release.

As a part of the promotion, Ram Gopal Varma and Vishnu Manchu visited Visakhapatnam where they interacted with media and audiences at VMax Multiplex theater. The full videos of Nee Meeda Ottu and Seema Lekka along with an action sequence were shown to the media and audiences there. After receiving good response there, the team of the film including Ram Gopal Varma, Mohan Babu and Vishnu Manchu visited Mallikharjuna theatre in Hyderabad where the team interacted with media and the audiences at the theater and also projected about 10 mins of songs and scenes from the film there.

Soundtrack 

Sai Karthik composed the music and the background score for the film. In mid March 2014, it was announced that the audio would release at Tirupathi on 20 March 2014. The audio launch event was done at Sree Vidyanikethan educational institutions in Tirupati on 20 March 2014 and the whole cast and crew of the film attended the event. The audio was released on Puri Sangeet label. In the end of March 2014, it was reported that an album named Cycle Rowdy would be released which was used in the film as a tribute to Ilaiyaraaja. The background score was also dedicated to him as a tribute.

Ram Gopal Varma told to the media "I have been a huge fan of background scores ever since I became a film buff and one of my all time favorite of the music piece is the cycle chase back ground score given by Ilaiyaraaja in my debut film Siva. I still can't forget the goose bumps I got back in 1989 when Ilaiyaraaja was scoring music for that sequence. I wanted to bring the attention to track number 17 in the album Rowdy whoever ever liked and remembered that cycle chase music in Siva, I am sure they will enjoy listening to this background track."

He added "As a huge fan of this legendary musician, my main interest is to bring back this composition to express the great idea of the genius Ilaiyaraaja's 1989 soundtrack (of Siva) to 2014. I asked Sai Karthik to do an integration of the brilliant cycle chase theme from Siva into the main theme of Rowdy and it turned out to be brilliant. This is my salute to Ilaiyaraaja." On the same day i.e. on 29 March 2014 the soundtrack consisting of 22 Background tracks was released by 24 Frames Factory on YouTube and other social networking sites including the Cycle Rowdy track. All the lyrics were penned by Kasarla Shyam.

Release 
In early March 2014, it was reported that the film would release worldwide on 28 March 2014 clashing with Nandamuri Balakrishna's Legend. On 19 March 2014 it was officially declared that the film would release on 4 April 2014 in India and a day before i.e. on 3 April 2014 in USA. It was also reported later that the film will release with English subtitles in major markets worldwide to take full advantage of RGV film's pull across India and in the global markets. However, the leaders of Uttarandhra Joint Action Committee launched a morcha in Visakhapatnam demanding to ban the release of the movie. Alleging that the movie promotes rowdyism, the protesters stated that they will be filing a petition with the Election Commission to ban the film's release. The protesters contested that the episodes in the movie could be inflammatory. Meanwhile, the film was awarded an A certificate without any cuts from Central Board of Film Certification.

Reception
The film received positive reviews from critics though they drew comparisons and similarities with Ram Gopal Varma's Sarkar. The Hindu gave a review stating "The film is helped hugely by good performances from Mohan Babu, Vishnu and Jayasudha. While Varma can be commended for channelising Mohan Babu’s aggression in an apt role, one wishes he hadn’t made the actor say ‘respect’ so many times that it becomes a joke. Rowdy is one of the better films from Varma is recent times but offers nothing new in content." Oneindia Entertainment gave a review stating "Overall, Ram Gopal Varma has taken the story from his Sarkar and weaved a different screenplay for Rowdy keeping Telugu audience in mind. He has also added a few commercial ingredients to it. It is a good entertainer and will be a treat for action lovers. Must watch the film for Mohan Babu fans" and rated the film 3/5. Deccan Chronicle gave a review stating "Varma’s films are always technically good and ‘Rowdy’ is no exception. The action sequences are well choreographed, especially the one where goons surround Mohan Babu. RGV, however, is still out of touch and most of the scenes and camera angles are mere repetitions of his earlier films. If you haven't seen ‘Sarkar’, you can watch ‘Rowdy’, especially for Mohan Babu's performance" and rated the film 2.5/5.

123telugu.com gave a review stating "‘Rowdy’ is an intense action thriller that makes for a good watch. If you have seen Godfather, the impact may be a little less. The movie's appeal might be limited to A centers alone. Watch the film for Mohan Babu" and rated the film 3.25/5. idlebrain.com gave a review stating "Mohan Babu is a superb actor. After M Dharmaraju MA and Rayalaseema Ramanna Chowdary, this is the most compelling character he has done in his career. It took a director of Ram Gopal Varma calibre to present Mohan Babu in a natural avatar. Plus points of the film are Mohan Babu, Vishnu Manchu, and their characterizations. On the flip side, a toned-down violence and a compelling second half would have made the movie more universal. On a whole, Rowdy is a special film that adds a feather to the cap of Mohan Babu" and rated the film 3/5. IndiaGlitz gave a review stating "If you wanted to see Mohan Babu do an Amitabh Bachchan while retaining his irreverent style, 'Rowdy' fulfills that urge. The discerning might lament it as a dumbed-down version of Sarkar, though" and rated the film 3.25/5.

References

External links
 

2014 films
Films directed by Ram Gopal Varma
Indian crime drama films
2010s Telugu-language films
Telugu remakes of Hindi films
Indian political thriller films
2014 crime drama films
2014 crime action films
Indian action drama films
Indian films about revenge
2010s political thriller films
Films scored by Sai Karthik